Tibor Komáromi (born 15 August 1964) is a Hungarian former wrestler who competed in the 1988 Summer Olympics and in the 1992 Summer Olympics.

References

External links
 

1964 births
Living people
Olympic wrestlers of Hungary
Wrestlers at the 1988 Summer Olympics
Wrestlers at the 1992 Summer Olympics
Hungarian male sport wrestlers
Olympic silver medalists for Hungary
Olympic medalists in wrestling
Medalists at the 1988 Summer Olympics
World Wrestling Championships medalists
20th-century Hungarian people
21st-century Hungarian people